"Bolje da nosim kratku kosu" (trans. Better that I wear my hair short) is the second single by the Serbian punk rock band Pekinška Patka. The song, having an anthem status in former Yugoslav republics, with its B-side, appeared on the band debut album Plitka poezija. The song also appeared on the cult various artists compilation Svi marš na ples!.

Track listing 
Both tracks by Nebojša Čonkić and Sreten Kovačević.
 "Bolje da nosim kratku kosu" (2:30)
 "Ori, ori" (1:56)

Cover versions 
 Serbian punk band Atheist Rap recorded a cover version of the song as a part of the Pekinška Patka cover versions mix entitled "Plitka poezija".

References 
  The single at Discogs
 EX YU ROCK enciklopedija 1960–2006, Janjatović Petar; 

1980 singles
1980 songs